Helmut Johannes Baierl (23 December 1926 Rumburk, Czechoslovakia – 12 September 2005 in Berlin) was a German playwright and vice president of the DDR Academy of Arts, Berlin. He was born in Rumburk (Czechoslovakia) and died in Berlin. He was a member of the Nazi Party from 1944 to 1945, of the Liberal Democratic Party of Germany (LDPD) from 1945 to 1947 and of the Socialist Unity Party of Germany (SED) from 1947 to 1989.

Works 
 Gladiolen, ein Tintenfass und eine bunte Kuh, 1953
 Ein Wegweiser, 1953
Die Feststellung, 1958
Frau Flinz, 1961
Die Feststellung, 1961
Der rote Veit, 1962
Fünf Geschichten vom Dreizehnten, 1963
H. Baierl, M. Wekwerth "Frau Flinz", 1965
Johanna von Döbeln, 1969
Der lange Weg zu Lenin, 1970
Die Köpfe oder das noch kleinere Organon, 1974
Gereimte Reden (Agitationslyrik), 1976
Leo und Rosa", 1982
Das zweite Leben des F. G. W. Platow, 1983
Die Lachtaube, 1984
Polly erzählt. Jugenderinnerungen eines Großstadthundes, 1986,

References 

1926 births
2005 deaths
People from Rumburk
Sudeten German people
Nazi Party members
Liberal Democratic Party of Germany politicians
Socialist Unity Party of Germany members
East German writers
20th-century German writers
German male writers
People of the Stasi
Recipients of the National Prize of East Germany
Recipients of the Patriotic Order of Merit in silver